Elsted railway station served the village of Elsted in the county of West Sussex in England. The village itself was a mile away to the south-west. The station was on the line between Petersfield and Midhurst, which was operational between 1 September 1864 and the last train ran on 5 February 1955. The station building has now been cleared for an industrial development, although nearby railway cottages are still in existence.

References 

 

Disused railway stations in West Sussex
Railway stations in Great Britain opened in 1864
Railway stations in Great Britain closed in 1955
Former London and South Western Railway stations